Anna Palaiologina may refer to:

 Anna of Hungary ( 1260–1281), Byzantine empress-consort, 1273–1281
 Anna Komnene Palaiologina ( 1260–1300), daughter of Michael VIII, wife of Demetrios Doukas Komnenos Koutroules
 Anna of Savoy (1306–1365), Byzantine empress-consort, 1326–1341
 Anna Palaiologina (daughter of Michael IX) (died 1320), queen-consort of Epirus, ca. 1307–1320
 Anna Palaiologina (daughter of Andronikos Angelos Palaiologos) (died after 1363), queen-consort of Epirus, ca. 1323–1338
 Anna of Moscow (1393–1417), Byzantine empress-consort, 1414–1417
 Anna Palaiologina Notaras (died 1507), daughter of Loukas Notaras